Bokkeum-bap or fried rice is a Korean dish made by stir-frying bap (cooked rice) with other ingredients in oil. The name of the most prominent ingredient other than cooked rice often appears at the very front of the name of the dish, as in kimchi-bokkeum-bap (kimchi fried rice).

Varieties

As an add-on 
In Korean restaurants, fried rice is a popular end-of-meal add-on. Diners may say "bap bokka juseyo" ( literally "Please fry rice.") after eating main dishes cooked on a tabletop stove, such as dak-galbi (spicy stir-fried chicken) or nakji-bokkeum (stir-fried octopus), then cooked rice along with gimgaru (seaweed flakes) and sesame oil will be added directly into the remains of the main dish, stir-fried and scorched.

By ingredients 
The name of the most prominent ingredient other than cooked rice often appears at the very front of the name of the dish. Kimchi-bokkeum-bap (kimchi fried rice), beoseot-bokkeum-bap (mushroom fried rice), saeu-bokkeum-bap (shrimp fried rice) are some examples. When there is no main or special ingredient, the dish is usually called either bokkeum-bap (fried rice) or yachae-bokkeum-bap (vegetable fried rice).

By style 
Korean Chinese fried rice, often called junggukjip bokkeum-bap ("Chinese restaurant fried rice") in South Korea, is characterized by the smoky flavor from the use of wok on high heat, eggs scrambled or fried in the scallion-infused oil, and the jajang sauce (a thick black sauce used in jajangmyeon) served with the dish.

Another popular dish, cheolpan-bokkeum-bap ("iron griddle fried rice") is influenced by the style of Japanese teppanyaki. The Japanese word teppan ("iron griddle") and the Korean word cheolpan ("iron griddle") are cognates, sharing the same Chinese characters.

See also 

 Chāhan
 Chǎofàn
 Khao phat 
 Nasi goreng

References 

Fried rice
Korean rice dishes